Wossman High School is a senior high school in Monroe, Louisiana, and a part of Monroe City Schools.

Athletics
Wossman High athletics competes in the LHSAA.

Championships
Football Championships
(1) State Championship: 1986
 (2) state championship : 2021 and 2022

References

External links
 Wossman High School

Monroe, Louisiana
Public high schools in Louisiana
Schools in Ouachita Parish, Louisiana